Dysaphis is a genus of aphids found in Europe, North America and Australia.

Species
The following species are recognised in the genus Dysaphis:
 
 Dysaphis acroptilidis
 Dysaphis affinis (Mordvilko, 1928)
 Dysaphis allii 
 Dysaphis angelicae (C.L.Koch, 1854)
 Dysaphis angelicophaga Zhang, Guangxue, Xiaolin Chen, Tiesen Zhong & Jing
 Dysaphis anisoidis Barbagallo & Stroyan, 1982
 Dysaphis annulata (Börner, 1950)
 Dysaphis anthrisci Börner, 1950)
 Dysaphis apiifolia (F.V.Theobald, 1923)
 Dysaphis ariae (Börner, 1950)
 Dysaphis armeniaca 
 Dysaphis atina A.K.Ghosh, R.C.Basu & D.N.Raychaudhuri, 1969
 Dysaphis aucupariae (Buckton, 1879)
 Dysaphis bonomii (Hille Ris Lambers, 1935)
 Dysaphis brachycyclica 
 Dysaphis brancoi Börner, 1950)
 Dysaphis brevirostris Börner, 1950)
 Dysaphis bunii Shaposhnikov, 1956
 Dysaphis candicans (Passerini, 1879)
 Dysaphis capsellae 
 Dysaphis caucasica 
 Dysaphis centaureae (Börner, 1950)
 Dysaphis cephalariae 
 Dysaphis cephalarioides Shaposhnikov, 1956
 Dysaphis chaerophylli (Börner, 1940)
 Dysaphis chaerophyllina Shaposhnikov, 1959
 Dysaphis cnidii Shaposhnikov & Stekolshchikov, 1989
 Dysaphis cousiniae 
 Dysaphis crataegi (Kaltenbach, 1843)
 Dysaphis crathaegaria (Del Guercio, 1930)
 Dysaphis crathaegiphila (Del Guercio, 1930)
 Dysaphis crithmi (Buckton, 1886)
 Dysaphis deltoidei Shaposhnikov & Stekolshchikov, 1989
 Dysaphis devecta (F.Walker, 1849)
 Dysaphis eremuri 
 Dysaphis ferulae (Nevsky, 1929)
 Dysaphis flava Shaposhnikov, 1956
 Dysaphis fluviovis 
 Dysaphis foeniculus (F.V.Theobald, 1923)
 Dysaphis gallica (Hille Ris Lambers, 1955)
 Dysaphis handeliae 
 Dysaphis henrystroyani Barbagallo & Patti, 1994
 Dysaphis hirsutissima (Börner, 1940)
 Dysaphis hissarica 
 Dysaphis incognita Shaposhnikov & Moralev, 1978
 Dysaphis indica 
 Dysaphis inulae Rezwani, 2008
 Dysaphis kadyrovi Depa & Kanturski, 2017
 Dysaphis karyakini Stekolshchikov & Buga, 2018
 Dysaphis lappae (C.L.Koch, 1854)
 Dysaphis laserpitii (Börner, 1950)
 Dysaphis lauberti (Börner, 1940)
 Dysaphis leefmansi (Hille Ris Lambers, 1954)
 Dysaphis libanotidis Shaposhnikov, 1956
 Dysaphis ligulariae 
 Dysaphis longipilosa 
 Dysaphis malidauci
 Dysaphis maritima (Hille Ris Lambers, 1955)
 Dysaphis microsiphon (Nevsky, 1929)
 Dysaphis mordvilkoi 
 Dysaphis multisetosa A.N.Basu, 1969
 Dysaphis munirae 
 Dysaphis narzikulovi Shaposhnikov, 1956
 Dysaphis neostroyani Ilharco, 1965
 Dysaphis newskyi (Börner, 1940)
 Dysaphis oreoselini Szelegiewicz, 1982
 Dysaphis orientalis
 Dysaphis papillata 
 Dysaphis parasorbi (Börner, 1952)
 Dysaphis pavlovskyana Narzikulov, 1957
 Dysaphis peucedani Szelegiewicz, 1982
 Dysaphis pimpinellae 
 Dysaphis plantaginea (Passerini, 1860)
 Dysaphis plantaginis (Pasek, 1955)
 Dysaphis pseudomolli 
 Dysaphis pulverina (Nevsky, 1929)
 Dysaphis pyraria 
 Dysaphis pyri (Boyer de Fonscolombe, 1841)
 Dysaphis radicivorans (Nevsky, 1929)
 Dysaphis radicola (Mordvilko, 1897)
 Dysaphis ramani 
 Dysaphis ranunculi (Kaltenbach, 1843)
 Dysaphis rara Shaposhnikov, 1987
 Dysaphis reaumuri 
 Dysaphis rumecicola (Hori, 1927)
 Dysaphis selinumi 
 Dysaphis seselii Vaskovskaya, 1979
 Dysaphis shaposhnikovi Stekolshchikov, 1998
 Dysaphis sharmai 
 Dysaphis sibirica 
 Dysaphis sorbi (Kaltenbach, 1843)
 Dysaphis sorbiarum 
 Dysaphis tadzhikistanica 
 Dysaphis taisetsusana (Miyazaki, 1971)
 Dysaphis taraxaci 
 Dysaphis tschildarensis 
 Dysaphis tulipae (Boyer de Fonscolombe, 1841)
 Dysaphis ubsanurensis 
 Dysaphis unicauli
 Dysaphis uralensis Shaposhnikov, 1956
 Dysaphis ussuriensis Shaposhnikov & Stekolshchikov, 1989
 Dysaphis vandenboschi Stroyan, 1972
 Dysaphis viennoti G.Remaudière, 1989
 Dysaphis virgata 
 Dysaphis zini Shaposhnikov, 1956
 BOLD:AAK9769 (Dysaphis sp.) 
 BOLD:ACB7196 (Dysaphis sp.) 
 BOLD:ACO7881 (Dysaphis sp.) 
 BOLD:ACR3448 (Dysaphis sp.)

References

Aphididae